Combloux is a commune in the Haute-Savoie department in the Auvergne-Rhône-Alpes region in Southeastern France, with a population of over 2,000 residents. A mountain village in the French Alps, it is also popular as a ski resort.

History
Before Combloux became a skiing resort, it was a traditional mountainous village with the main economy being made from farming which still exists today. It has stone and wooden chalets for accommodation and besides the residents, chalets are also an option for tourists. Combloux's permanent residents are over 2,100; the village has expanded quickly recently. Combloux has been described as La perle du mont Blanc ("The pearl of the Mont Blanc") as a full view of the Mont Blanc is ever present. Combloux also has the first ecological lake for swimmers in France, open in summer and heated by the sun.

Tourism
In winter, Combloux is a skiing resort. It shares its skiing area with Megève, Saint-Gervais, Les Contamines, and La Giettaz, as a part of the "Evasion Mont-Blanc" area which gives it a total of 445 km of skiable pistes.

Combloux is also a tourist destination in summer, mainly for hiking and mountain-biking.

See also
Communes of the Haute-Savoie department

References

External links
 Tourist office website
Gazetteer Entry for Combloux

Communes of Haute-Savoie
Ski resorts in France